Sophie Adenot (born 5 July 1982) is a French engineer, helicopter pilot, and astronaut. A French Air and Space Force helicopter pilot with the rank of lieutenant colonel, Adenot became France's first female helicopter test pilot in 2018. In 2022, she was chosen as a member of the European Astronaut Corps.

Early life and education 
Sophie Adenot was born on 5 July 1982, in Cosne-Cours-sur-Loire, in Burgundy, France, to pharmacist  and Hubert Adenot, a notary in Corbigny.

Adenot attended a maison d'éducation de la Légion d'honneur, secondary schools open to daughters of members of the National Order of the Legion of Honour, in Saint-Denis to obtain a baccalaureate, and then attended higher school preparatory classes to prepare for enrolment in one of the grande écoles.

From 2001 to 2003, Adenot studied engineering at institut Supérieur de l'Aéronautique et de l'Espace (ISAE-SUPAERO), in Toulouse, where she specialized in the flight dynamics of aircraft and spacecraft and earned a degree in 2004. She earned a Master of Science from the Massachusetts Institute of Technology in Cambridge in 2004. She worked at MIT's Man-Vehicle Laboratory and wrote her thesis on how the vestibular system adapts to artificial gravity to develop centrifuge training for astronauts. For one year after graduating from MIT, in 2004, she was employed as an engineer at Airbus Helicopters, in Marignane, to design helicopter cockpits, especially those of H225 helicopters.

Career

Air force service 

Adenot joined the French Air Force in 2005. After receiving helicopter pilot training, she was assigned to the Escadron d'Hélicoptères 1/67 Pyrénées, stationed at Cazaux Air Base, where from 2008 to 2012 she piloted Caracal helicopters for search and rescue missions within hostile territory. In 2012, she was assigned to the High Authority Transport Squadron, located in Villacoublay, responsible for transporting the head of state, ministers, and delegations from foreign nations.

In 2017, she entered the école du personnel navigant d'essais et de réception, a test pilot school, and in 2018 became the first female helicopter test pilot in France. After graduating from Empire Test Pilots' School in the United Kingdom in 2018, she worked as a helicopter test pilot at Cazaux Air Base under the French Defence Procurement Agency from 2019 to 2022. , she has accumulated 3,000 flying hours across 22 types of helicopters.

Adenot earned the rank of lieutenant in the Air Force in August 2006, and rose to the rank of captain three years later, commandant in December 2014, and lieutenant colonel in June 2020.

Astronaut career 
Adenot was selected to join the European Astronaut Corps as part of the 2022 European Space Agency Astronaut Group. Adenot is the second French woman to join the European Astronaut Corps, after Claudie Haigneré. Adenot and the sixteen other members of the group were selected from 22,500 candidates.

Awards and honors 
In 2020, Adenot was recognized by the Young Leaders program of the French-American Foundation. She was appointed a chevalier in the French National Order of Merit in 2022.

References 

European Space Agency personnel
Massachusetts Institute of Technology alumni
Glider pilots
Helicopter pilots
Supaéro alumni
French aerospace engineers
French spationauts
Women aerospace engineers
1982 births
Living people